Voliš li me ti (English: Do You Love Me) is the seventh studio album by Bosnian Serb singer Indira Radić, released in 1998.

Track listing
Voliš li me ti
Zabranjeno
Junačko srce
Crne zore
Majko
Kafana
Decembar
Spakuj svoje stvari
Srce puno otrova
Da, da, da

References

1998 albums
Indira Radić albums